Mark Anthony (born 13 October 1989 in Malang, Indonesia) is an Australian judoka. He lives in Geelong, Australia. He competed in the – 81kg event at the 2008 Summer Olympics in Beijing and lost his first match against Mario Valles. Four years later, he took part in the – 90 kg tournament at the 2012 Summer Olympics and lost in the repechage to Ilias Iliadis.  He has been Australian Judo Champion on four occasions.

References

External links
 
 
 

1989 births
Living people
Australian male judoka
Olympic judoka of Australia
Judoka at the 2008 Summer Olympics
Judoka at the 2012 Summer Olympics
Judoka at the 2014 Commonwealth Games
Commonwealth Games competitors for Australia
Sportspeople from Malang